Elections were held in South Dakota on November 2, 2010. Primary elections took place on June 8, 2010 for the Democratic Party, Republican Party, and Constitution Party.

Federal

United States Senate

Republican incumbent John Thune ran for re-election.

United States House

Democratic incumbent Stephanie Herseth Sandlin ran for re-election.

State

Governor

Mike Rounds, the Republican Governor, was term-limited and did not seek re-election in 2010. Five candidates ran for the Republican nomination. The winner of the Republican primary faced Democratic State Senator Scott Heidepriem in the general election.

Other Statewide Officers
The offices of Lieutenant Governor, Secretary of State, 2010 South Dakota Attorney General election, Treasurer, Auditor, Commissioner of School and Public Lands, and Public Utility Commissioner were all up for election in 2010. Candidates for each party were nominated at the 2010 state conventions of each political party.

State Senate
All thirty-five seats of the South Dakota Senate were up for election in 2010.

State House of Representatives
All seventy seats in the South Dakota House of Representatives were up for election in 2010.

Judicial positions
Multiple judicial positions were up for election in 2010.
South Dakota judicial elections, 2010 at Judgepedia

Ballot measures
Four measures were certified for the November 2 ballot:
1. Protects the right to secret ballots in federal, state, and union representation elections
2. Repeals the automatic annual transfer of $12 million from the trust fund to the state general fund
3. Extends smoking ban to apply statewide
4. Proposes legalization of medical marijuana
South Dakota 2010 ballot measures at Ballotpedia

Local

County officers
County offices including County Commissioners, County Auditors, County Registers of Deeds, and County Sheriffs were up for election in 2010.

Party representatives
In its closed primary election on June 8, party members elected delegates to the Republican Party State Convention and the Democratic Party State Convention.

References

Offices to be filled in the 2010 Elections, South Dakota Secretary of State, Retrieved April 9, 2010.

External links
Elections and Voter Registration from the South Dakota Secretary of State
Candidates for South Dakota State Offices at Project Vote Smart
South Dakota Polls at Pollster.com

South Dakota Congressional Races in 2010 campaign finance data from OpenSecrets
South Dakota 2010 campaign finance data from Follow the Money
 Imagine Election - Find out which candidates will appear on your ballot - search by address or zip code.

 
South Dakota